Poole Museum (formerly known as the Waterfront Museum) is a local history museum situated on the Lower High Street in the Old Town area of Poole, Dorset, and is part of the Borough of Poole Museum Service. Entrance to Poole Museum is free, and the museum is the fifth most visited free attraction in South West England.

History
Opened in 1989 and set in a 19th-century harbour warehouse, Poole Museum illustrates the story of the town and its people. A major refurbishment of the museum took place in 2005 at a cost of £1,300,000 funded by the Heritage Lottery Fund and local fundraising. The renovated museum opened in July 2007 with new public facilities including a terrace and a visitor lounge with views over Poole Harbour and the Old Town and a new glass atrium entrance designed by Richard Horden of Horden Cherry Lee Architects.

The centrepiece of the museum is the 2,000-year-old Poole Logboat, an Iron Age vessel which was found in 1964 during dredging work in Poole Harbour. The museum also has a floor devoted to the history of Poole Pottery and some of the company's products are on display. Other galleries have displays telling the history of Poole from prehistory through to the 21st century.

On the third floor of the Museum, with a terrace overlooking Poole Harbour, is Cafe Explore, the Museum's new cafe, serving breakfast, lunch and tea dishes and drinks. Attached to the main Poole Museum building, in the Grade I listed medieval town cellars, is the Local History Centre, containing an extensive library of material involving Poole's heritage supported by microfilmed and digitised material. Poole Museum Service also manages Scaplen's Court Museum and Garden, situated next to Poole Museum. This is a Grade I listed medieval townhouse, which is opened to the public in August. The Garden is open May to September.

In 2021 the museum was given a £2.24 million pound grant by the National Lottery Heritage Fund. A revamp will turn the site into a "world-class cultural centre". In May 2022 it was reported that redevelopment costs had increased by 20%. The museum closed for renovation in December 2022 with plans to reopen in late 2024.

Exhibitions
Since 2014, there has been an exhibition showcasing finds from the Swash Channel Wreck, one of the most important shipwrecks found in British waters. The exhibition traces the history of this high status early 17th century ship and focuses on the excavation and conservation of the wreck. In 2016, the museum held an exhibition entitled "Lines of Thought" that focused on 70 artworks that reveal inner feelings of the artists.

References

External links
 Poole Museum - official site

Museums in Poole
Museums established in 1989
Local museums in Dorset
1989 establishments in England
Grade I listed buildings in Dorset